Mount Mondarrain (Arranomendi in Basque) is in the French Basque Country, south of Espelette and south-west of Itxassou in the province of Labourd , peaking at  altitude.

To prevent Marquess of Wellington's army invading France in 1813, Marshal Soult built a line of fortifications and entrenchments along the river Nivelle from the sea inland to fortified rocks on Mount Mondarrain. The lines were breached during the Battle of Nivelle 10 November 1813.

Notes

References

Mountains of Pyrénées-Atlantiques
Northern Basque Country
Mountains_under_1000_metres